The Beach Boys' Christmas Album is the seventh studio album by the American rock band the Beach Boys, released November 9, 1964 on Capitol Records. It contains five original songs and seven standards on a Christmas theme. The album proved to be a long-running success during subsequent Christmas seasons, initially reaching No. 6 on Billboards Christmas LP's chart in its initial release and eventually going gold. Music historian James Perone wrote that it is "regarded as one of the finest holiday albums of the rock era".

While leader Brian Wilson produced and arranged the rock songs, he left it to Dick Reynolds (an arranger for the Four Freshmen, a group Wilson idolized) to arrange the 41-piece orchestral backings on the traditional songs to which the Beach Boys would apply their vocals. One single was released from the album, the original song "The Man with All the Toys" backed with the group's rendition of "Blue Christmas". "Little Saint Nick", a single which had already been released the previous year, was included on the album.

In 1977, the Beach Boys attempted to follow the album with Merry Christmas from the Beach Boys, but it was rejected by their label. The entire Christmas Album plus selections from the Merry Christmas sessions were later assembled for the 1998 compilation Ultimate Christmas.

Background
The album was devised as a response to Phil Spector's A Christmas Gift for You from Philles Records (1963), an album Brian had attended recording sessions for. He played piano on the song "Santa Claus Is Coming to Town" but was dismissed by Spector due to his substandard piano playing. Original album cover photo by George Jerman for Capitol Photo Studio. The a-side consists mostly of original Christmas-themed rock songs penned by Brian Wilson and Mike Love, while the b-side features both secular and religious Christmas standards with orchestral accompaniment directed by Dick Reynolds.

Recording
With the exception of "Little Saint Nick", sessions for the album spanned June 18–30, 1964, one month after the All Summer Long album was completed. "Christmas Day" is the first Beach Boys song to feature a lead vocal from Al Jardine.

The album was released in mono and stereo; the stereo mix, prepared by engineer Chuck Britz, would be the last true stereo mix for a Beach Boys album until 1968's Friends.

In addition to orchestral renditions of "Jingle Bells" and the original Wilson composition "Christmas Eve" which never received vocal overdubs, outtakes of the All Summer Long track "Little Honda" and The Beach Boys Today! single "Don't Hurt My Little Sister" were recorded in between June sessions.

Reception

In a retrospective review, AllMusic's Jason Ankeny stated: "Brian Wilson's pop genius is well suited to classic Yuletide fare, and the group delivers lush performances of standards ranging from 'Frosty the Snowman' to 'White Christmas' as well as more contemporary material like 'The Man With All the Toys' and 'Blue Christmas.'"

While interviewing Wilson for a promotional radio special in 1964, Jack Wagner remarked that Wilson's decision to sing solo on a version of "Blue Christmas" could be "the start of a whole new career," to which Wilson responded "I don’t know. It could and it couldn't. I really don’t know." Referring to the standards which he believed "proved that the Beach Boys' vocal power was bigger and more agile than the surf and hot rod records [and] staking a claim for wider musical terrain," author Luis Sanchez reflected: "The Beach Boys' Christmas Album music shows a quality of aesthetic selectivity that none of the group's records that came before it do, aspiring not just to assimilate one of pop's stock ideas, but also enabling Brian to make one of his biggest artistic advances."

On April 6, 1982, the album was certified gold by the RIAA, selling more than 500,000 units.

 Ultimate Christmas 
Released in 1998, Ultimate Christmas is a compilation containing all of the twelve tracks from the original Christmas LP in stereo. Many bonus tracks were added, including the 1974 single "Child of Winter" and several previously unreleased tracks from the aborted 1977 album Merry Christmas from the Beach Boys.

 Track listing 
Mike Love's writing credits on the tracks marked with a (*) were only awarded after a 1994 court case.

Personnel
Partial credits courtesy of session archivist Craig Slowinski.The Beach BoysAl Jardine
Mike Love
Brian Wilson
Carl Wilson
Dennis WilsonAdditional musicians and technical staff'
 Al Viola – guitar
 David Marks - guitar (Little Saint Nick) (possibly)
 Cliff Hils – double bass
 Jimmy Rowles – grand piano
 Jack Sperling – drums
 Eddie Rosa – flute and/or alto saxophone and/or tenor saxophone
 Chuck Gentry – soprano clarinet, alto clarinet, tenor clarinet, and/or bass clarinet and/or baritone saxophone 
 William Hinshaw, Richard Perissi, Arthur Briegleb – French horns
 Henry Laubach, John Audino, Conrad Gozzo, Raymond Triscari – trumpets
 Harry Betts, Francis Howard, George Roberts – trombones
 George “Red” Callender – tuba
 Edgar Lustgarten, Jesse Ehrlich, Nathan Gershman, Alfred Wohl, Margaret Aue – violins, violas, cellos, and/or double basses
 Benjamin Barrett – orchestra master
 Dick Reynolds – orchestra conductor
 Mainerd Baker, George Yocum – copyists
 Bill Putnam – engineer- Orchestral tracks
 Chuck Britz- engineer
 Mark Linett- remix engineer (1991)

Charts

References

External links

1964 Christmas albums
Albums produced by Brian Wilson
Albums recorded at Capitol Studios
Albums recorded at United Western Recorders
The Beach Boys albums
Christmas albums by American artists
Capitol Records Christmas albums
Pop rock Christmas albums